The 1916–17 season was Manchester City F.C.'s twenty-sixth season of league football.

Owing to World War I, once again Manchester City played non-competitive war league football. In the principal tournament they contested the Lancashire Section, which was expanded to 16 teams to give a more complete 30-game season. In the subsidiary tournament they contested Group D of the Lancashire Section, with the groups reduced to four teams in size to complement the increased playing season of the Principal Tournament.

Team Kit

War Leagues

Principal Tournament

Lancashire Section

Results summary

N.B. Points awarded for a win: 2

Reports

Subsidiary Tournament

Lancashire Section, Group D

Results summary

N.B. Points awarded for a win: 2

Reports

Squad statistics

Squad
Appearances for competitive matches only

Scorers

All

Principal Tournament

Subsidiary Tournament

See also
Manchester City F.C. seasons

References

External links
Extensive Manchester City statistics site

Manchester City F.C. seasons
Manchester City F.C.